Nalini Krishan (born August 30, 1977) is a Fiji-born Australian actress best known for role as Barriss Offee in Star Wars: Episode II – Attack of the Clones.

Early life
Nalini Krishan is an Indo-Fijian who was raised in Australia.

Early career
Nalini Krishan is currently filming reality TV series called Bollywood Factor in Australia, airing on Divya TV and c31 Indian Cable TV network in the United States, United Kingdom, and Australia in April 2014.

Krishan is an Australian actress who has had roles in Swift Shift couriers Love Pizza, an array of TV commercials and starred in some Bollywood films such as Prem Aggan and Soldier, just to name a few.

Krishan has been acting and modeling for the last 18 years. She is a former miss Fiji Indian Sun winner and also has graced the catwalk through many Indian community events. Nalini has travelled around the world meeting many fans at conventions in USA, Canada, Europe, Japan, New Zealand, and Australia from her most notable role in the second Star Wars episode where she played Jedi Barriss Offee.

Krishan’s bio includes lead roles such as the lead in short film Noise, a guest star role in Love you Krishna, the feature film coming out in cinemas 2014 and before that she played the lead in the theatre play Curry for Lunch. Her most recent debut is in the reality TV series Bollywood Factor, where she is one of the five finalists. Airing on US, UK, and Australian Indian cable networks in 2014.

Krishan moved to the United States after her role in Star Wars, where she is based in Los Angeles.

Nalini Krishan was on June 2, 2017 inducted as an honorary member of The Galactic Academy Tatooine largest campus in the caribbean. The Galactic Academy is a worldwide organization with over 30 campuses around the world . She spoke to around 150 graduating padawans plus family members at one of the largest meetings of educators on the island of Puerto Rico that very same day.

Filmography

Film

Television

References

External links

Starnow profile
Nalini Krishan on Instagram

1977 births
Living people
People from Suva
Fijian film actresses
Fijian people of Indian descent
Australian film actresses
Australian people of Indian descent
Australian people of Indo-Fijian descent
Australian actresses of Indian descent
Actresses in Hindi cinema
Australian expatriate actresses in India
Fijian emigrants to Australia
21st-century Australian actresses